A ladle transfer car is a material handling tool which is used in foundries. The car carries a metal ladle, typically torpedo-shaped (with two pointed ends), from one location to another for processing molten liquid metal. It can also be called a molten steel transporter, a bottle car, or a Tundish transfer car.

The ladle is placed on a rail car but can be removed to pour out the molten liquid.

References

External links 
 Low loader wagon with 16 wheel sets of the type Uaais 823 of the NCS (NUCLEAR CARGO + SERVICE GmbH, Hanau), set as 35 RIV 80 D-NCS 9957 000-6, parked on 08/16/2011 in Siegen-Eintracht.

Material-handling equipment